Samla Mammas Manna was a Swedish progressive rock band often characterized by virtuosic musicianship, circus references and silly humour, similar in many ways to the song-writing style of Frank Zappa. They were one of the founding members of the Rock in Opposition (RIO) movement in the late 1970s. In 1979 they were Fred Frith's backing band on his solo album, Gravity (1980). Musically, they bore a resemblance to the Canterbury scene.

The original line-up was Lars Hollmer (keyboards), Hasse Bruniusson (drums), Lars Krantz (bass) and Henrik Öberg (percussion). For Måltid, jazz fusion guitarist Coste Apetrea joined the group.

They were on the fringe of the Swedish political "progg" movement, although their lyrics were humorous and not explicitly political. The title of the album Klossa Knapitatet is a play on the Swedish phrase krossa kapitalet, a common slogan in the 1970s that means "crush the capital", and also the title of a seminal progg song by Blå Tåget, called "Staten och Kapitalet (Den ena handen vet vad den andra gör)". Some more serious elements of the progg movement were not amused by this frivolous attitude.

The band underwent line-up and name changes over the years (they released albums as Zamla Mammaz Manna and von Zamla), reinventing their sound each time. In 1999, the band reformed under their original name for a one-off release entitled Kaka. In 2002 they reunited again, this time with Japanese musician Tatsuya Yoshida on drums, for some performances and their final album Dear Mamma. The band played their first concerts in the US in August 2003, in Chicago at Schuba's, and at the annual Progday festival in North Carolina.

In 2005 the band opened the international progressive rock festival that took place in Moscow, Russia, InProg 2005.

Hollmer died in December 2008.

Discography

as Samla Mammas Manna
Samla Mammas Manna (1971)
Måltid (1973)
Klossa Knapitatet (1974)
Snorungarnas symfoni (1976)
Kaka (1999)
Dear Mamma (2002)

as Zamla Mammaz Manna
För äldre nybegynnare (1977)
Schlagerns mystik (1978)
Familjesprickor (1980)

as von Zamla
Zamlaranamma (1982)
No Make Up! (1984)
... 1983 (live) (1999)

See also
Romantic Warriors II: A Progressive Music Saga About Rock in Opposition

External links

Swedish rock music groups
Swedish progressive rock groups
Rock in Opposition
Musical groups established in 1969
Musical groups disestablished in 1980
Musical groups reestablished in 1990
Musical groups disestablished in 2008
Musical groups from Uppsala
Silence Records artists